Cross Timber is a town in Johnson County, Texas, in the United States. As of the 2010 census the population was 268.

Geography

Cross Timber is located in northern Johnson County at  (32.486468, –97.327312).

Demographics

At the 2000 census, there were 277 people, 108 households and 85 families residing in the town. The population density was 200.5 per square mile (77.5/km2). There were 115 housing units at an average density of 83.2 per square mile (32.2/km2). The racial makeup of the town was 89.89% White, 0.36% African American, 2.17% Native American, 0.72% Asian, 2.53% from other races, and 4.33% from two or more races. Hispanic or Latino of any race were 6.86% of the population.

There were 108 households, of which 29.6% had children under the age of 18 living with them, 68.5% were married couples living together, 7.4% had a female householder with no husband present, and 20.4% were non-families. 18.5% of all households were made up of individuals, and 7.4% had someone living alone who was 65 years of age or older. The average household size was 2.56 and the average family size was 2.79.

Age distribution was 23.5% under the age of 18, 6.5% from 18 to 24, 26.4% from 25 to 44, 35.0% from 45 to 64, and 8.7% who were 65 years of age or older. The median age was 41 years. For every 100 females, there were 88.4 males. For every 100 females age 18 and over, there were 91.0 males.

The median household income was $47,083, and the median family income was $51,500. Males had a median income of $47,083 versus $25,833 for females. The per capita income for the town was $23,259. About 3.2% of families and 4.2% of the population were below the poverty line, including 10.2% of those under the age of eighteen and none of those 65 or over.

Education
Cross Timber is served by the Burleson and Joshua Independent School Districts.

References

External links
Town of Cross Timber official website

Dallas–Fort Worth metroplex
Towns in Johnson County, Texas
Towns in Texas